The Lone Mountain Dolomite is a dolomite geologic formation in Nevada.

It preserves fossils dating back to the Silurian period.

See also

 Lone Mountain Formation  — Silurian Utah
 List of fossiliferous stratigraphic units in Nevada
 Paleontology in Nevada

References
 

Silurian geology of Nevada
Silurian System of North America
Geologic formations of Nevada